Stefan Sonnenfeld is an American Digital Intermediate (DI) colorist, co-founder and president of post-production house Company 3, and president of VFX house Method Studios. He has performed color grading/color correction on many commercials and feature films including the Pirates of the Caribbean and Transformers franchises.

Career
Sonnenfeld grew up in Los Angeles and after a summer job delivering dailies for popular 80s series Miami Vice his interest in post production was ignited. He worked at Pacific Ocean Post during the 1990s.

Described by NPR as a "da Vinci of the movies," Sonnenfeld has worked as a DI colorist for films including Watchmen, Star Trek, Terminator Salvation, 300, Sweeney Todd and Dreamgirls. As many commercial directors made the transition to long-form work, Sonnenfeld became increasingly involved in grading feature films, helping to pioneer the digital intermediate process. Sonnenfeld is among a handful of artists who have championed the telecine (and more recently DI) process.

In 2007, Entertainment Weekly named Sonnenfeld to its list of "50 Smartest People in Hollywood" and Creativity-Online included him in its "Creativity 50" in 2008. Sonnenfeld also received the HPA Award Best Color Grading (Feature Film) for 300 in 2007 and was the recipient of the HPA Award Outstanding Color Grading (Commercial) for Pepsi "Pass" in 2009. In 2010 he received the HPA Award for Outstanding Color Grading Using a DI Process for Alice in Wonderland.

Sunny Field Entertainment
In 2010, Sonnenfeld signed a first-look producing deal with Paramount Pictures for his feature film production company, Sunny Field Entertainment. Based in Santa Monica, CA, Sunny Field is a portal for filmmakers in the commercial/music video space making the leap into features. Sunny Field's offerings include the traditional resources of a production company as well as state-of-the-art post-production services.

Selected filmography

Feature films 

As colorist, supervisor & executive producer

2021

2022

2023

Television

Music videos

Commercials & Ads

References

Living people
American business executives
Year of birth missing (living people)
People from Los Angeles